David M. Paul (born 1968) is a Democratic member of the Washington House of Representatives.

Paul, who worked at Skagit Valley College for a decade, was first elected to the state legislature in 2018, running against Republican incumbent Dave Hayes. Before joining the House of Representatives, Paul served on the Oak Harbor Educational Foundation's Board of Directors as well as serving as the vice-president of Institutional Planning and Effectiveness at Skagit Valley College.

Paul represents the 10th Legislative District, which includes Island County as well as parts of both Skagit County and Snohomish County.

References 

1968 births
Living people
Democratic Party members of the Washington House of Representatives
21st-century American politicians